The 2007 Euro-Asia Masters Challenge was a professional non-ranking team (also referred to as the Euro–Asia Team Challenge) and invitational snooker event that took place from 12 to 15 July 2007 at the Queen Elizabeth Stadium in Wan Chai, Hong Kong.

The tournament was a revival of the two Euro-Asia Masters Challenge events played under the same name in 2003. The tournament's team event consists of two teams of four, the European team and the Asian team, playing in a single-frame, best-of-nine competition, with Team Europe defeating Team Asia with a score of 5–3. The tournament's singles event featured eight players in two groups of four, with the top two in each group progressing to semi-finals. John Higgins defeated James Wattana 5–4 in the final to win the £25,000 prize.

Teams and players

Results

Euro–Asia Team Challenge 

Frame 1:  John Higgins 7 – 71(70)  Marco Fu   — (Europe 0 – 1 Asia)
Frame 2:  Ken Doherty 86(61) – 42  James Wattana — (Europe 1 – 1 Asia)
Frame 3:  Stephen Hendry 66 – 19  Ding Junhui  — (Europe 2 – 1 Asia)
Frame 4:  Ronnie O'Sullivan 99(68) – 9  Supoj Saenla  — (Europe 3 – 1 Asia)
Frame 5:  John Higgins 39 – 56  Ding Junhui  — (Europe 3 – 2 Asia)
Frame 6:  Stephen Hendry 38 – 75  James Wattana  — (Europe 3 – 3 Asia)
Frame 7:  Ken Doherty 65 – 31  Supoj Saenla  — (Europe 4 – 3 Asia)
Frame 8:  Ronnie O'Sullivan 80(50) – 8  Marco Fu  — (Europe 5 – 3 Asia)

Euro-Asia Masters Challenge

Round-robin stage
Group A

Results:
 John Higgins 2–0 Stephen Hendry
 James Wattana 2–0 Ding Junhui
 James Wattana 2–1 Stephen Hendry
 John Higgins 2–0 Ding Junhui
 John Higgins 2–0 James Wattana
 Ding Junhui 2–1 Stephen Hendry

Group B

Results:
 Ken Doherty 2–1 Ronnie O'Sullivan
 Marco Fu 2–1 Ken Doherty
 Ronnie O'Sullivan 2–0 Supoj Saenla
 Marco Fu 2–0 Supoj Saenla
 Ken Doherty 2–0 Supoj Saenla
 Marco Fu 2–0 Ronnie O'Sullivan

Knock-out stage

Century breaks

 127  John Higgins
 123  Marco Fu
 117  Ronnie O'Sullivan

References

Euro-Asia Masters Challenge
2007 in Hong Kong sport
2007 in snooker